Ruscombe is a village and civil parish, east of Twyford in the Borough of Wokingham in Berkshire, England.

History
Reports from the late 1800s provided summaries of the status of the village; in 1876, the population was 200 and that increased to 349 by 1895. The village was served by a National school. The primary landowners were TC Garth and Rev. A Barker. St James the Great church was described as "a building of flint and brick, consisting of chancel, nave, south porch, and an embattled western tower". A history of the parish published in 1923 provided extensive coverage of the previous centuries. At that time, the settlement included "a few modern cottages" as well as the manor and church.

Parish church
The Church of England parish church of St James was built in the late 12th century. Its Norman chancel survives but its nave and west tower were rebuilt in 1638–39. Additional modifications were made in the 1800s. The church has been a Grade I listed building since 1967. St James' is part of a united benefice with St. Mary's, Twyford. The benefice is in turn part of a local ecumenical partnership with Twyford United Reformed Church. In March 2020, the partnerships included St Mary's Twyford, St Nicholas Hurst, St James Ruscombe and Twyford United Reformed Church.

Manor
Built in the late 16th century, and extensively modified since the 19th century, the timber-framed manor has been known for centuries as Northbury Farmhouse. The 1923 report stated that the manor house had been converted into two cottages, and was described as "a much modernized half-timber and brick building". A book first published in 1951 by Nikolaus Pevsner, confirmed that Ruscombe Manor was already known as Northbury Farmhouse by that time. The farmhouse has been a Grade II listed building since 1952. At that time, it was described as "Manor house, now large house. Late C16. Altered C19 & C20. Timber frame with brick infilling". A report in 2018 provided this information about the gardens:"The gardens have been developed over the last 20 years when an ancient oak and a venerable Cornus mas together with a few other mature trees and an abundance of Leylandii (all gone!) were all that were noteworthy. The garden is now broken up into several separate areas, the cottage garden, the herbaceous garden, the rose garden a shrub & general area and a modern section with grasses and a Japanese garden. Behind this the garden opens into a less formal area with woodland and a stream and pond. Altogether there are over 1500 different species of plants spread over the 12 acres".

In 2020, after extensive renovations and an extension over the years, the property was listed for sale by the owners, Sir Colin Southgate and Lady Sally Southgage, who had purchased Northbury Farm in 1990. The sale included not only the primary home, but also two cottages, tennis courts, the Grade II Listed tithe barn and granary, as well as a series of outbuildings.

Notable people
William Penn, the founder of Pennsylvania, lived in Ruscombe from 1710 until his death in 1718.
The actor Dennis Price, co-star of the film Kind Hearts and Coronets, was born in Ruscombe in 1915.

Amenities
Ruscombe Football Club plays in the Reading Sunday League.

References

Bibliography

External links
Stroud Voices (Ruscombe filter) - oral history site

Villages in Berkshire
Civil parishes in Berkshire
Borough of Wokingham